Koru (former Kuri) is a belde (town) in the Çınarcık district of Yalova Province, Turkey. Up to 20th century the population was composed of Greeks. Situated at   it is between Çınarcık to west and Yalova to east, all coastal places on the Anatolian side of Marmara Sea. The population of Koru is 5257 as of 2010.

Name 
The name of the settlement was Kuri . After the Population exchange between Greece and Turkey agreement, the former population of the settlement was replaced by the Turks from Serres and Drama in 1924. Former name was changed to a Turkish name with a similar sound and meaning small forest quite suitable for Koru.

History 
In 1992, the settlement was declared a seat of township. 

In 1999 the town suffered from the Great earthquake. Now the town is flourishing as a center of floriculture. Many agricultural crops are also produced.

References

Populated places in Yalova Province
Towns in Turkey
Populated places in Çınarcık District
Populated coastal places in Turkey